Rob van den Brink, also reported as Rob Vandenbrink'(born 30 September 1962) is a Canadian former rugby union player. He played in eight matches for the Canada national rugby union team from 1986 to 1991, including one match at the 1987 Rugby World Cup and three matches at the 1991 Rugby World Cup.

References

External links

 

1962 births
Living people
Canadian rugby union players
Canada international rugby union players
Sportspeople from British Columbia